Ramularia vallisumbrosae is a fungal plant pathogen infecting daffodils (Narcissus), causing narcissus white mould disease.

References

Bibliography

External links

Fungal plant pathogens and diseases
vallisumbrosae
Fungi described in 1899